John English may refer to:

John Hawker English (1788–1840), English surgeon
John A. English, Canadian academic and soldier
John English (Canadian politician) (born 1945), Canadian historian and politician
John English (director) (1903–1969), British-American film director
John English (Australian politician) (born 1962), Australian politician
John English (theatre director) (1911–1998), English theatre director
John English (ice hockey) (born 1966), Canadian former NHL player
John F. English (1889–1969), American labor union official
Jon English (1949–2016), Australian singer and actor
Jonathan English, English film director and producer
John W. English (1831–1916), Justice of the Supreme Court of Appeals of West Virginia

See also 
Johnny English (film series), a British series of spy comedy films
Johnny English, 2003 British comedy film
Johnny English Reborn, the 2011 sequel
Johnny English Strikes Again, the 2018 sequel
John English Junior Middle School, Ontario, Canada
Jack English (disambiguation)